Euacanthellinae is a subfamily of leafhoppers, native to Australia, New Caledonia and Madagascar, and adventive in New Zealand. There are 11 described species in 4 genera. 10 species in 3 genera are native to Australia, Madagascar has a single endemic genus/species, and New Caledonia has a single undescribed species of uncertain generic placement. New Zealand has a single species, Euacanthella palustris, adventive from Australia. There are two tribes, Euacanthellini (containing just Euacanthella), and Sagmatini.

References 

Cicadellidae